Mariano Nicolás González (born 5 May 1981) is a retired Argentine professional footballer who played as an attacking midfielder or as a winger.

Club career
Born in Tandil, Buenos Aires Province, González started his career at Racing Club de Avellaneda, arriving at 17 from neighbouring Club Atlético Independiente. He made his professional debut at 21 under legendary Osvaldo Ardiles, and went on to appear in 64 Primera División matches, notably scoring the 4–3 winner against Boca Juniors.

In 2004, González left for Italy, signing with Serie A side U.S. Città di Palermo and going on to feature regularly during two seasons, especially the second. For the 2006–07 campaign he was loaned to Inter Milan, where he failed to break into the starting lineup, barred by the likes of Luís Figo and Dejan Stanković. Later, Inter opted not to renew the loan deal, and Palermo subsequently accepted a similar request by FC Porto on 17 July 2007.

After Ricardo Quaresma's sale to precisely Inter, González was acquired on a permanent basis by the Portuguese, for €3.25 million, rejoining former Palermo teammate (and countryman) Ernesto Farías, and began to feature more prominently, notabling scoring in the last minute to level it 2–2 at Manchester United, for the 2008–09 UEFA Champions League quarter-finals, while also being an important part of the northerners' back-to-back Primeira Liga conquests (he also won the competition while on loan).

After 2010–11 finished, González was released by Porto and joined Estudiantes de La Plata on a free transfer.

International career
González won his first cap for Argentina in 2003, under Marcelo Bielsa. The following year he was summoned for the Copa América as the nation finished second, and also played olympic football at the 2004 Summer Olympics, winning gold.

Managerial career
On 1 April 2022 it was confirmed, that González had been appointed interim manager of Santamarina; the club he - at the time - already was playing for. González was - alongside his long-term friend Osvaldo Barsottini as his assistant - in charge for 12 games (five draws and seven losses), before he was replaced in June 2022.

Personal life
González's younger brother, Pablo, was also a footballer. A striker, he too started his career at Racing Club, and spent several seasons in Italy.

Honours

Club
Racing Club
Argentine Primera División: 2001 Apertura

Inter
Serie A: 2006–07

Porto
Primeira Liga: 2007–08, 2008–09, 2010–11
Taça de Portugal: 2008–09, 2009–10, 2010–11
Supertaça Cândido de Oliveira: 2009
UEFA Europa League: 2010–11

International
Argentina
Summer Olympics: 2004

References

External links

1981 births
Living people
People from Tandil
People from Buenos Aires Province
Argentine people of Spanish descent
Argentine footballers
Association football wingers
Argentine Primera División players
Primera Nacional players
Racing Club de Avellaneda footballers
Estudiantes de La Plata footballers
Arsenal de Sarandí footballers
Club y Biblioteca Ramón Santamarina footballers
Club Atlético Huracán footballers
Club Atlético Colón footballers
Serie A players
Palermo F.C. players
Inter Milan players
Primeira Liga players
FC Porto players
Argentina international footballers
2004 Copa América players
Olympic footballers of Argentina
Footballers at the 2004 Summer Olympics
Olympic medalists in football
Olympic gold medalists for Argentina
Medalists at the 2004 Summer Olympics
Argentine expatriate footballers
Expatriate footballers in Italy
Expatriate footballers in Portugal
Argentine expatriate sportspeople in Italy
Argentine expatriate sportspeople in Portugal
Sportspeople from Buenos Aires Province
Argentine football managers